Animation Academy is an attraction at Disney California Adventure, Walt Disney Studios Park, Hong Kong Disneyland, Disney's Animal Kingdom and Epcot. The same attraction formerly existed in Disney's Hollywood Studios, and DisneyQuest, which closed in 2017.

Tokyo Disneyland also features an almost identical attraction, named simply Disney Drawing Class, within The Disney Gallery in World Bazaar. The attraction was closed permanently on September 30, 2016, to make way for Bibbidi Bobbidi Boutique.

In Shanghai Disneyland's Marvel Universe, a similar attraction called Marvel Comic Academy is operating. This attraction features Marvel Comic's characters instead of Disney movies characters.

At Disney's Animal Kingdom, The Animation Experience at Conservation Station opened within Rafiki's Planet Watch on July 11, 2019, and its drawing classes feature popular Disney animals.

The Epcot version will open in Play! Pavilion in 2024 with Edna Mode from The Incredibles making appearances and teaching guests how to draw different Disney characters.

Summary
The attraction opened together with DisneyQuest in Walt Disney World in 1998. It was also added  to Disney's Hollywood Studios and Disney California Adventure. It can be found within Art of Disney Animation at Walt Disney Studios Park. The attraction opened at Hong Kong Disneyland on July 14, 2007 and is located adjacent to the Opera House in Main Street, U.S.A.

The attraction itself is a drawing session with a Disney animator who teaches guests to draw a Disney character. Guests may take their own artwork home if they want after the drawing session.

References

External links
 Disney California Adventure official website
 Walt Disney Studios Park (Official Website)
 Hong Kong Disneyland (Official Website)
 Shanghai Disneyland (Official Website)
 Disney's Animal Kingdom (Official Website)

Walt Disney Parks and Resorts attractions
Disney California Adventure
Walt Disney Studios Park
Hong Kong Disneyland
Shanghai Disneyland
Disney's Animal Kingdom
Epcot
Main Street, U.S.A.
Hollywood Land
Animation Courtyard
Toon Studio (Walt Disney Studios Park)
World Discovery
Former Walt Disney Parks and Resorts attractions
Amusement rides planned to open in 2024